"I Will Be Here" is a song recorded by Tiësto and Sneaky Sound System with vocals from Sneaky Sound System's Connie Mitchell. Released on 28 July 2009, the song is the first single off the album Kaleidoscope.

Music video
The music video for "I Will Be Here" premiered on Tiësto's Myspace on 7 August 2009. Tiësto teamed up with acclaimed Japanese director Masashi Muto and dancer Mori Koichiro to create the music video for "I Will Be Here", a collaboration with Sneaky Sound System. It begins with a man working on a single computer in a lab, while the screens begin to display Tiësto and Sneaky Sound System logos. He puts on a single speaker "backpack," hooked up to a "Tiësto" cassette player, and presses play. As the music starts, he begins to walk in a robotic fashion, as the computer screens all flicker and switch to the same logos as he leaves the lab. All the lights around him begin to pulsate he walks by, synchronized with the music, while the blue stripes on his white spacesuit outfit also show different light animations. Exiting through a parking deck, he eventually makes his way through Shibuya, Tokyo, and does one final dance in the middle of the famous intersection in front of the Hachiko exit at Shibuya Station, before going to the top of a building, where he "powers down" as the music ends.

Chart performance
In the United States, the single became their first number one single for both acts on Billboards Dance/Mix Show Airplay chart, where it reached that peak in its 21 November 2009 issue. The song also peaked at number 44 in the United Kingdom and number 33 in the Netherlands.

Track listing

Charts

References

External links
 "I Will Be Here" music video

2009 singles
2009 songs
Tiësto songs
Sneaky Sound System songs
Song recordings produced by Danja (record producer)
Songs written by Connie Mitchell
Songs written by Tiësto
Ultra Music singles
14th Floor Records singles